The Singing Marine is a 1937 American musical film directed by Ray Enright and Busby Berkeley and starring Dick Powell. It was the last of Powell's trio of service-related Warners films:  1934's Flirtation Walk paid tribute, of sorts, to the Army, and 1935's  Shipmates Forever to the Navy.  This one is distinguished by its two musical sequences directed by Busby Berkeley.

Cast 

 Dick Powell as Private Robert Brent
 Doris Weston as Peggy Randall
 Lee Dixon as Corporal Slim Baxter
 Hugh Herbert as Aeneas Phinney / Clarissa
 Jane Darwell as "Ma" Marine
 Allen Jenkins as Sergeant Mike Kelly
 Larry Adler as himself
 Marcia Ralston as Helen Young
 Guinn 'Big Boy' Williams as Dopey
 Veda Ann Borg as Diane
 Jane Wyman as Joan
 Berton Churchill as J. Montgomery Madison
 Eddie Acuff as Sam
 Henry O'Neill as Captain Skinner 
 Addison Richards as Felix Fowler
 unbilled players include Ward Bond, Richard Loo, and Doc Rockwell as himself

External links 

 

1937 films
Films directed by Ray Enright
Films scored by Heinz Roemheld
Warner Bros. films
Films about the United States Marine Corps
1937 romantic comedy films
1930s romantic musical films
American black-and-white films
American romantic comedy films
American romantic musical films
1930s English-language films
1930s American films